Bather with a Griffon Dog is an 1870 oil-on-canvas painting by French artist Pierre-Auguste Renoir.  The painting features his lover and model Lise Tréhot (1848-1922). The work was exhibited at the 1870 Salon.  The painting is held in the collection of the São Paulo Museum of Art.

References

External links
 Bather with a Griffon Dog at the São Paulo Museum of Art

Paintings by Pierre-Auguste Renoir
1870 paintings
Paintings in the collection of the São Paulo Museum of Art
Dogs in art